Tainan Dalpra Costa (born 6 November 2000) is a Brazilian jiu-jitsu black belt competitor. A winner of every major tournaments as a colored belt, Dalpra is a two-time World, Pan American, and European champion. Dalpra is ranked No. 1 in the middleweight 2022-2023 IBJJF Gi Ranking.

Career 
Tainan Dalpra was born in Florianópolis, Brazil. At the age of 5, his father started teaching him Brazilian jiu-jitsu. While competing at the  IBJJF Pan Kids at the age of 13, while he was an orange belt, Dalpra met Rafael and Guilherme Mendes of the Art of Jiu-Jitsu Academy (AOJ) which runs one of the best jiu-jitsu kids programs in the world. In 2015 Dalpra moved to Costa Mesa, California joining AOJ's competition team and scholarship program under the guidance of the Mendes brothers. As a juvenile Dalpra won every competition that he joined including Pan Jiu-Jitsu and World Jiu-Jitsu. In 2018 he won double gold at every single competition in the adult division and was promoted to purple belt on the podium of the world championship.

In October 2020 Dalpra was promoted to black belt on the podium of the Pan championship by his coach Guilherme Mendes. In 2021 Dalpra won the World Championship, the Pan Championship, and the Abu Dhabi Grand Slam Miami. He also competed at BJJ Stars 6 on June 26, 2021 and submitted Athos Mirando with a lapel choke. He returned to the promotion at BJJ Stars 7 on November 6, 2021 where he submitted Lucas Gualberto with a toehold. He was then invited to compete in the IBJJF Middleweight Grand Prix on November 13, 2021. He defeated Renato Canuto 9-2 on points in the opening round and submitted Jonnatas Gracie with a choke in order to win the tournament.

He then won the 2022 European Championship and the 2022 Pan Jiu-Jitsu Championship for the second time, a tournament he has now won at blue, purple, brown and black belt. In May, 2022 it was announced that Dalpra had a signed a contract to compete for ONE Championship in the future. Dalpra then won the IBJJF World Championship in the middleweight division for a second time in 2022. Dalpra was invited to compete in a superfight against Rodrigo Lopes at the IBJJF Middleweight Grand Prix on October 28th, 2022. He submitted Lopes with an armbar at 4:22.

Dalpra returned to the IBJJF European Championship in 2023, winning gold in the middleweight division. In March 2023 Dalpra faced Isaque Bahiense in a 30-minute superfight at the IBJJF FloGrappling Grand Prix in Austin, Texas. Dalpra won the match on points, 19-2.

Dalpra is ranked No. 1 in the 2022 FloGrappling Pound For Pound Gi Rankings, No. 1 in the middleweight 2022-2023 IBJJF Gi Ranking and No. 2 in the overall Gi Ranking.

Brazilian Jiu-Jitsu competitive summary 
Main Achievements (Black Belt):
 Jitsmagazine BJJ Awards 'Male Grappler of the Year (Gi)' (2021/2022)
 IBJJF World Champion (2021 / 2022)
 2 x IBJJF Pan Champion (2021 / 2022))
 IBJJF European Open Champion (2022)
 AJP Grand Slam Miami winner (2021)

Main Achievements (Colored Belts):
 IBJJF World Champion (2018 blue)
 2nd Place IBJJF World Championship (2019 purple)
 IBJJF Pan Champion (2018 blue, 2019 purple)
 IBJJF European Champion (2019 purple, 2020 brown)
 Abu Dhabi Grand Slam Miami winner (2020 brown)
 Abu Dhabi Grand Slam Abu Dhabi winner (2018 purple)
 Abu Dhabi Grand Slam Los Angeles winner (2018 purple)
 Abu Dhabi World Pro Champion (2019 purple
 IBJJF Juvenile World Champion (2016 / 2017)
 IBJJF Juvenile World Champion NoGi (2016)
 IBJJF Juvenile Pan Champion (2016 / 2017)
 2nd Place IBJJF Juvenile World Championship (2017)

Notes

References 

Living people
2000 births
Sportspeople from Florianópolis
Brazilian practitioners of Brazilian jiu-jitsu
People awarded a black belt in Brazilian jiu-jitsu
World Brazilian Jiu-Jitsu Championship medalists